Jan Stránský (born April 16, 1990) is a Czech professional ice hockey player. He played with HC Plzeň in the Czech Extraliga during the 2010–11 Czech Extraliga season.

Stránský previously played for Gatineau Olympiques, Halifax Mooseheads, HC Dukla Jihlava and KLH Chomutov.

References

External links

1990 births
Living people
Czech ice hockey right wingers
Gatineau Olympiques players
Halifax Mooseheads players
HC Berounští Medvědi players
HC Plzeň players
HC Benátky nad Jizerou players
HC Bílí Tygři Liberec players
HC Dukla Jihlava players
HC Slavia Praha players
Piráti Chomutov players
Sportspeople from Plzeň
University of West Bohemia alumni
Czech expatriate ice hockey players in Canada